Jenő Várady (born 1889, date of death unknown) was a Hungarian rower. He competed in the men's eight event at the 1908 Summer Olympics.

References

1889 births
Year of death missing
Hungarian male rowers
Olympic rowers of Hungary
Rowers at the 1908 Summer Olympics
Place of birth missing